Carnotite is a potassium uranium vanadate radioactive mineral with chemical formula K2(UO2)2(VO4)2·3H2O. The water content can vary and small amounts of calcium, barium, magnesium, iron, and sodium are often present.

Occurrence

Carnotite is a bright greenish-yellow mineral that occurs typically as crusts and flakes in sandstones. Amounts as low as one percent will color the sandstone a bright yellow. The high uranium content makes carnotite an important uranium ore. It is a secondary vanadium and uranium mineral usually found in sedimentary rocks in arid climates.

In the United States it is an important ore of uranium in the Colorado Plateau region of the United States where it occurs as disseminations in sandstone and concentrations around petrified logs. It also occurs in the U.S. states of Wyoming, Colorado, South Dakota, Nevada, Arizona, and Utah. It also occurs incidentally in Grants, New Mexico, and Carbon County, Pennsylvania.

Carnotite is reported in Congo (Kinshasa), Morocco, Australia (Radium Hill) and Kazakhstan.  In Pakistan carnotite occurs in the Upper Miocene middle Siwaliks sandstone (Dhokpathan Formation), in the vicinity of Takhat Nasrati, Karak District.

Name and discovery
The mineral was first described in 1899 by French scientists M. M. C. Freidel and E. Cumenge, who identified it in specimens from Roc Creek in Montrose County, Colorado, United States. It is named for Marie Adolphe Carnot (1839–1920), French mining engineer and chemist.

Uses 
Carnotite is an ore of uranium.  At times in the early 20th century, it was mined primarily for radium or vanadium.

The mineral was used to produce quack devices involving radioactive substances.

Related mineral species
Several related mineral species exist, including: margaritasite ((Cs,K,H3O)2(UO2)(VO4)2·H2O) and  tyuyamunite, (Ca(UO2)2(VO4)2·5-8H2O).

See also

List of minerals
List of minerals named after people

References

External links

Mineral Galleries

Vanadate minerals
Potassium minerals
Uranium(VI) minerals
Monoclinic minerals
Minerals in space group 14
Minerals described in 1899